The Central Fire Station on Abbey Road in Barrow-in-Furness, Cumbria, England is a Grade II listed former fire station that has been described by Historic England as a "well-preserved example of the first generation of fire station built specifically for motorised appliances". Constructed in 1911 and opening a year later, the building served as the town's only station until Cumbria Fire and Rescue Service completed their first new-build station on Phoenix Road in 1996. The building is noted for its striking red brick facades and buff terracotta dressings, it bears a strong resemblance to the Technical School built less than 10 years prior nearby on the opposite side of Abbey Road. The building has since been converted into a 'Bed Brigade' store.

See also
 Listed buildings in Barrow-in-Furness

References

External links
 Barrow Fire Flickr Profile

Central Fire Station
Central Fire Station, Barrow-in-Furness
Central Fire Station, Barrow-in-Furness
Central Fire Station, Barrow-in-Furness
1911 establishments in England